Morning in the Streets is a BBC television documentary directed by Denis Mitchell and Roy Harris in 1959, for the BBC Northern Film Unit. It was broadcast on 25 March 1959.

The documentary was described simply as "an impression of life and opinion in the back streets of a northern city in the morning". It is an impressionistic slice-of-life documentary, featuring footage of working-class people and street scenes, accompanied by a montage soundtrack of voices conveying opinions and philosophies on life. The film was researched by a writer on Liverpool life and dialect, Frank Shaw.

The music was specially composed by Thomas Henderson and Liverpool songwriter Stan Kelly, and featured the harmonica of classical musician Tommy Reilly.

The Talking Streets
The Talking Streets was a radio feature produced by Denis Mitchell for the BBC North Region, as part of his People Talking series, and broadcast on 27 October 1958. The programme was a kaleidoscope of voices, sounds and stories recorded by Mitchell using a portable tape recorder. These recordings provided the inspiration and the basis of the soundtrack for Morning in the Streets.

Recent revivals
It was shown on BBC Four in 2008 as part of the Liverpool on the Box season to coincide with the city being European Capital of Culture, and again in September 2010. It was then further repeated in July 2011 on BBC Four as part of the "Britain through a Lens" season.

References

External links 
 Morning in the Streets at the BBC Archive
 Morning in the Streets BBC Liverpool article
 
 Morning in the Streets (1959) at the British Film Institute's Screenonline website

British documentary films
1959 films
BBC television documentaries
Films set in Liverpool
1959 documentary films
Documentary films about cities
1950s English-language films
1950s British films